Lajos Für (21 December 1930 – 22 October 2013) was a Hungarian politician and historian, who served as Minister of Defence between 1990 and 1994. From 1994 to 1996 he was also chairman of the Hungarian Democratic Forum (MDF), the ruling conservative party led by late Prime Minister József Antall to his death in 1993.

Für was born in Egyházasrádóc. He participated in the Hungarian Revolution of 1956. In later years, he was active in Magyar Gárda, a paramilitary organization which had connections to Jobbik and was described as neo-fascist. He died, aged 82, in Budapest.

Personal life
He was married with Friderika Bíró, with whom he had two children, Ágnes and Balázs. Ágnes was the wife of the Hungarian Fidesz-politician Tamás Deutsch.

Publications
A csákvári uradalom a tőkés gazdálkodás idején (1970)
Mennyi a sok sírkereszt? Magyarország embervesztesége a második világháborúban (1987)
Hol vannak a katonák? (1988)
Kisebbség és tudomány (1989)
Világjáró magyarok (1990)
Sors és történelem (1991)
Szabadon szeretnék sírni (1993)
Jobbágyföld – parasztföld (1994)
Magyar sors a Kárpát-medencében (2001)
Az én történelmem I. (2003)
A Varsói Szerződés végnapjai – magyar szemmel (2003)
"Ne bántsd a magyart!". Bartók és Kodály történelemszemlélete; Kairosz, Bp., 2005
Bevérzett mámor, 1956; Kairosz, Bp., 2006
Világjáró magyarok; 2nd ed.; Ligatura, Szentendre, 2009
Kárpát-medencei létünk a tét; Kairosz, Bp., 2010

References

External links
Dr. Lajos Für (in Hungarian)

1930 births
2013 deaths
People from Vas County
People of the Hungarian Revolution of 1956
Hungarian Democratic Forum politicians
20th-century Hungarian historians
Defence ministers of Hungary
Members of the National Assembly of Hungary (1990–1994)
Members of the National Assembly of Hungary (1994–1998)